Béla Glattfelder (born 4 May 1967 in Budapest) is a Hungarian politician and Member of the European Parliament (MEP) with the Hungarian Civic Party, part of the European People's Party and sits on the European Parliament's Committee on International Trade.

Glattfelder is a substitute for the Committee on Agriculture and Rural Development and the Committee on Fisheries. Glattfelder is also a member of the Delegation for relations with Mercosur.

Education
 1992: Agricultural engineer, University of Agriculture, Gödöllő (GATE)
 1994: Agricultural Research and Informatics Institute

Career
 1990–2004: Member of the Hungarian Parliament
 2000–2002: Undersecretary of State, Ministry of Economic Affairs

Personal life
He is married to Éva Umenhoffer.

See also
 2004 European Parliament election in Hungary

External links

References

1967 births
Living people
Fidesz MEPs
MEPs for Hungary 2004–2009
MEPs for Hungary 2009–2014
Members of the National Assembly of Hungary (1990–1994)
Members of the National Assembly of Hungary (1994–1998)
Members of the National Assembly of Hungary (1998–2002)
Members of the National Assembly of Hungary (2002–2006)